Károly Plattkó also known as Carlos Platko was a Hungarian football player and manager who coached CD Castellón, Sporting de Gijón, Real Valladolid, Recreativo de Huelva, Celta de Vigo, Girona FC and SD Ponferradina in Spain. His brothers were Franz Platko and Esteban Platko.

References

External links
BDFutbol profile

1896 births
Year of death missing
Hungarian footballers
Hungarian football managers
Hungarian expatriate football managers
La Liga managers
CD Castellón managers
Sporting de Gijón managers
Real Valladolid managers
Recreativo de Huelva managers
RC Celta de Vigo managers
Girona FC managers
SD Ponferradina managers
Hungarian expatriate sportspeople in Spain
Expatriate football managers in Spain
Association footballers not categorized by position
Footballers from Budapest
Tercera División managers
Segunda División managers